Tufi Rural LLG (formerly Cape Nelson Rural LLG) is a local-level government (LLG) of Oro Province, Papua New Guinea. The Onjob language is spoken in two villages within the LLG.

Wards
01. Kewansapsap
02. Marua
03. Uiaku
04. Ganjiga
05. Rainu
06. Koreaf
07. Ajoa
08. Itoto
09. Giriwa
10. Managa
11. Jebo
12. Baga
13. Kwave
14. Sefoa
15. Sinei
16. Berebona 1 & 2
17. Ako
21. Guruguru
23. Gobe
85. Tufi Govt. Station

References

Local-level governments of Oro Province